Fangcun Station is a station on Line 1 of the Guangzhou Metro that started operation on 28June 1997. It will be served by Line 11 and Line 22 in future.

It is situated under the junction of Huadi Avenue North and Fangcun Avenue Middle in Fangcun in the Liwan District. The station has four main exits (A-D) at each of the four corners of the concourse. There are two platforms on an island linked to the concourse by two banks of escalators and two stairways. Facilities include an ATM and a convenience store. The station is popular with revellers visiting the popular Bai'etan riverside bar street on Changdi Street approx 10 minutes walk from the station, as well as shoppers going to the large  superstore located nearby.

Transport connections

There are several bus stops nearby including the Fangcun Interchange station on Huadi Dadao at the southern entrance to the Zhujiang Tunnel, which is a major hub for cross-river buses. The Fangcun-Huangsha foot/cycle ferry runs from nearby Changdi Road. There is a staffed bicycle park outside Exit B of the station.

Station layout

Exits

References

Railway stations in China opened in 1997
Guangzhou Metro stations in Liwan District